NGC 6043 is a lenticular galaxy located about 444 million light-years away in the constellation Hercules. NGC 6043 was discovered by astronomer Lewis Swift on June 27, 1886. The galaxy is a member of the Hercules Cluster.

See also
 List of NGC objects (6001–7000)

References

External links

Hercules (constellation)
Lenticular galaxies
6043
57019
Astronomical objects discovered in 1886
Hercules Cluster
Discoveries by Lewis Swift